The following lists events that happened during 1911 in Chile.

Incumbents
President of Chile: Ramón Barros Luco

Events

May
2 May – The Chilean National History Museum is founded.

Births
16 January – Eduardo Frei Montalva (d. 1982)
11 June – Pedro Olmos Muñoz (d. 1991)
11 November – Roberto Matta (d. 2002)

Deaths 
date unknown – Joaquín Villarino

References 

 
Years of the 20th century in Chile
Chile